Tsietsi Peter Nyoni (born 1 January 1966) is a South African politician and a member of the African National Congress (ANC) who currently serves as the Deputy Director-General for the Mpumalanga Provincial Government. He previously served as one of the executive directors for the Mpumalanga Human Settlements Department until he was removed in 2013 from the position by then Premier (and now deputy president) David Mabuza. He was appointed to head the Department of Co-operative Governance and Traditional Affairs in the province in August 2016 until February 2020 when current Premier Refilwe Mtsweni-Tsipane made him the provincial government's Deputy Director-General.

Political career

Nyoni is a senior member of the ANC in Mpumalanga, having served as its regional deputy chairperson in the eHlanzeni region as well as its Provincial Executive Committee (PEC) member from 2012 to 2015

On 27 July 2015, the PEC suspended Nyoni as its member pending a disciplinary process over allegations that he was part of the 'Save Mpumalanga ANC' group that was opposed to the rule of then ANC provincial chairperson and now deputy president David Mabuza, accusing him of being a dictator and of using bogus delegates to endorse him as provincial chairperson for a third term.

It was formed to oppose the March 2015 provincial general council (PGC) that endorsed Mabuza to stand as chairperson for a third term. Nyoni contested the position of provincial deputy chairperson on a lobby camp opposed to Mabuza which had Mabuza's deputy David Dube as the chairperson.

Nyoni's camp was defeated when Mabuza's camp won at the provincial conference in December 2015, electing Mabuza unopposed as the chairperson of the Mpumalanga ANC for a third term, Violet Siwela as Mabuza's new deputy chairperson, Mandla Ndlovu as provincial secretary, deputy secretary Lindiwe Ntshalintshali and Vusi Shongwe as treasurer. Mabuza's re-election paved his way to go become the national deputy president at the 54th national congress that was held two years later in December 2017 in Nasrec.

After the August 2016 local government elections, Mabuza made a turnabout in ANC politics and called for unity within provincial party's structures, admitting that the ANC was being killed by the factionalism of its leaders and saying he no longer wanted to participate in factions

Still a Premier of Mpumalanga at that time, Mabuza reconciled with Nyoni and appointed him the head of the provincial Department of Co-operative Governance and Traditional Affairs in August 2016. Before this appointment, Nyoni had been a Director for Municipal Capacity Building at the Ehlanzeni District Municipality.

Nyoni was one of the executives of the provincial Human Settlements Department that included former ANC provincial deputy chairperson David Dube and Parliamentarian Bongani Bongo who Mabuza refused to renew their contracts in 2013. Mabuza said the reason was because they focused too much on politics and failed to deliver RDP houses.

When Mabuza was elected the deputy president of the ANC on 18 December 2017, Nyoni accepted nomination from ANC members to stand as his successor in Mpumalanga.

Others who were contesting for the position left by Mabuza in Mpumalanga were Mandla Msibi, Pat Ngomane, Sasekani Manzini, Charles Makola, Candith Mashego-Dlamini, Fish Mahlalela, Mandla Ndlovu and Refilwe Mtsweni-Tsipane

The contest was suspended in March 2020 due to the COVID-19 outbreak

References

External links
 https://pmg.org.za/committee-meeting/14548/ Pixley Ka Seme accreditation status; Mpumalanga progress report on Oversight Recommendations, Rental Housing Amendment Bill Committee Report

Living people
1966 births
21st-century South African politicians